Peter Keeley (born 1983 in Crumpsall Hospital) is a British screenwriter and author. He is the creator of the television series I'm with Stupid, which airs on BBC Three, and for his book series The London Road Mysteries.

Early life 
Keeley grew up in Crumpsall, Manchester, and wrote his first play The Role Model at the age of 14. The play focused a disabled boy who struggles to cope with various issues. He received the Scope Millennium Award to develop the play which was performed at Contact Theatre in Manchester where Keeley worked as a wheeling usher.

More Plays and Stand Up/Sit Down comedy were all to follow, all written by Keeley.

Education 
Keeley went to Manchester Metropolitan University where he studied English and Creative Writing. He graduated in 2010.

Career
The beginning of Keeley's career was a community play for The Royal Exchange, "Colour Blind" in 2002.

Keeley conceived a protagonist and several other characters in the series with disabilities. I’m with Stupid won an RTS Northwest Award for Best New Comedy in 2005.

In 2007, The Farrelly Brothers made an American pilot of the show for NBC. The pilot was written by Wil Calhoun, whose credits include Friends.

He has appeared on the BBC One show, A Thing Called Love (2004) and appeared in series two of BBC Radio 4's Comedy Pick-Ups (2009). He self-published his first book of Detective Fiction on Amazon Kindle. The first story is The Strange Case of Albert Mitchell (2013). He was reportedly inspired to write the series after examining and researching the London Road Fire Station, Manchester, which he learned had formerly served as a police station. fire station and coroner's court.

After The Strange Case of Albert Mitchell (2013), Keeley went on to write a sequel for The London Road Mysteries which released in 2014, The Heaton Park Murder.

Keeley then went on to write The Brewery Tap Mystery (2014), completing the trilogy to The London Road Mysteries. the trilogy was then released on Amazon Kindle. However the success of the Trilogy led Keeley to write a fourth book to The London Road Mysteries. This instalment to the series, The Mystery Of The Chemist's Folly (2016) is the latest.

Keeley was then offered a job in a section of the Sky Arts Art 50 initiative. This being Told By An Idiot. He started working on a project, Let Me Play The Lion Too (2018), an improvisational experiment, tackling the lack of diversity on stage.

References

External links
 
 Peter Keeley on Told By An Idiot



1983 births
Living people
British television writers
Place of birth missing (living people)
British television presenters